Teatro Chueca was a theatre on the Plaza de Chamberí in Madrid, Spain. It was built in 1925.

Notable plays
El jardín de las caricias (1926)
Para valiente el amor
Viva Alcorcón que es mi pueblo (1933)
La niña calamar (1935)
El Hombre invisible (1936)

References

Former theatres in Madrid
1925 establishments in Spain